Mitochondrial import inner membrane translocase subunit TIM16 also known as presequence translocated-associated motor subunit PAM16, mitochondria-associated granulocyte macrophage CSF-signaling molecule, or presequence translocated-associated motor subunit PAM16 is a protein that in humans is encoded by the PAM16 gene.

Structure 
The PAM16 gene is located on the p arm of chromosome 16 at position 13.3 and it spans 11,150 base pairs. The PAM16 gene produces a 15.1 kDa protein composed of 137 amino acids. The structure has been found to contain a 21-residue mitochondrial targeting leader sequence.

Function 
The PAM16 gene encodes for a mitochondrial protein with multiple functions. It is responsible for the regulation of ATP-dependent protein translocation into the mitochondrial matrix, inhibition of DNAJC19 stimulation of HSPA9/Mortalin ATPase activity, and granulocyte-macrophage colony-stimulating factor (GM-CSF) signaling. Furthermore, PAM16 plays a role in the import of nuclear-encoded mitochondrial proteins into the mitochondrial matrix and may be important in reactive oxygen species (ROS) homeostasis.

Clinical Significance
Mutations in the PAM16 gene has been shown to cause mitochondrial deficiencies and associated disorders. It is mainly associated with Megarbane-Dagher-Melike type spondylometaphyseal dysplasia, which is an autosomal recessive disease characterized by pre- and postnatal short stature, developmental delay, dysmorphic facial appearance, narrow chest, prominent abdomen, platyspondyly, short limbs, and other abnormalities of the skeleton.

Interactions 

PAM16 has been known to interact with PAM18, DNAJC19, TIMM17A, FEZ1, TRIM25, MARC1, and other proteins.

References

Further reading